Yashwant Narayan Sukthankar, CIE (1897–19??) was an Indian civil servant,  the second Cabinet Secretary of India and a former Governor of Odisha.

Sukthankar was a member of the Indian Civil Service. He joined the service in 1921 - the first batch of native ICS officers. He was a part of the Finance and Commerce Pool, comprising specialist civil servants, that was constituted at the level of the Government of India during the Second World War. Sukthankar was a specialist in international trade and he went on to serve as Secretary to the Government of India in the Ministry of Commerce and Industry and as Cabinet Secretary of India from May 14, 1953 to July 31, 1957. He also served as secretary of the Planning Commission of India that formulated India's Second Five Year Plan.

Upon retirement as Cabinet Secretary, he was appointed Governor of Orissa, a post he held from 31 July 1957 till 15 September 1962.

References

External links 
Cabinet Secretariat in India

1897 births
Year of death missing
Indian civil servants
Governors of Odisha
Indian Civil Service (British India) officers
Companions of the Order of the Indian Empire
Cabinet Secretaries of India
Members of the Planning Commission of India